The Man Who Returned to Life is a 1942 American black-and-white drama film directed by Lew Landers, written by Gordon Rigby and released by Columbia Pictures.

Plot 
David Jameson lives in a rural town in Maryland. He is forced to flee after he is suspected of murdering Beth Beebe, who tried to force him to marry her although he was engaged to another woman, Daphne Turner. He flees from town and takes on a new identity as George Bishop, marries Jane Meadows, and gets a comfortable job. Years later a skeleton is found on the Jameson farm. Believed to be the remains of Jameson, Beth's brother, Clyde Beebe, is charged with the murder and sentenced to die. David returns to his home town in an attempt to exonerate Clyde.

Cast 
 John Howard as David Hampton Jameson / George Bishop
 Lucile Fairbanks as Jane Meadows Bishop
 Ruth Ford as Beth Beebe
 Marcella Martin as Daphne Turner
 Roger Clarke as Harland Walker
 Elisabeth Risdon as Minerva Sunday
 Paul Guilfoyle as Clyde Beebe
 Clancy Cooper as Clem Beebe
 Helen MacKellar as Ma Beebe
 Kenneth MacDonald as Officer Fosse
 Carol Coombs as Marjorie Bishop / Angel Face
 Marguerite De La Motte as Mrs. Hibbard 
 Lois Collier as Mary Tuller
Minta Durfee as Mrs. Tuller

References

External links 
 “The Man Who Returned to Life” (NY Times)
 “The Man Who Returned to Life” (TCM)

1942 drama films
1942 films
Columbia Pictures films
American drama films
American black-and-white films
Films set in Maryland
Films directed by Lew Landers
1940s English-language films
1940s American films